Crooked Run Creek is a tributary of the Monongahela River southeast of Pittsburgh, Pennsylvania.

See also
List of rivers of Pennsylvania

References

Rivers of Allegheny County, Pennsylvania
Rivers of Pennsylvania
Tributaries of the Monongahela River
Allegheny Plateau